Leptaxis is a genus of air-breathing land snails, terrestrial pulmonate gastropod mollusks in the family Hygromiidae, the typical snails.

Species within this genus of snails create and use love darts as part of their mating behavior.

Species
Species within the genus Leptaxis include:
 Leptaxis azorica Albers, 1852
 Leptaxis bollei (Albers, 1856)
 Leptaxis caldeirarum (Morelet & Drouët, 1857) (uncertain status)
 † Leptaxis chrysomela (L. Pfeiffer, 1846)
 Leptaxis drouetiana (Morelet, 1860)
 Leptaxis erubescens Lowe, 1831
 † Leptaxis fluctuosa (R. T. Lowe, 1852) 
 Leptaxis furva (R. T. Lowe, 1831)
 Leptaxis groviana (A. Férussac, 1832)
 † Leptaxis isambertoi Teixeira & Groh, 2019 
 Leptaxis membranacea (R. T. Lowe, 1852)
 Leptaxis minor Backhuys, 1975 (uncertain status)
 Leptaxis nivosa (G. B. Sowerby I, 1824)
 † Leptaxis orzolae Gittenberger & Ripken, 1985 
 † Leptaxis psammophora (R. T. Lowe, 1852) 
 Leptaxis sanctaemariae (Morelet & Drouët, 1857)
 Leptaxis simia (A. Férussac, 1832)
 Leptaxis terceirana (Morelet, 1860) (uncertain status)
 Leptaxis undata (Lowe, 1831)
 † Leptaxis vetusa (Morelet & Drouët, 1857) 
 Leptaxis wollastoni (R. T. Lowe, 1852)

References

External links

 Mentioned at: 
 Lowe, R. T. (1852). Brief diagnostic notices of new Maderan land shells. The Annals and Magazine of Natural History. (2) 9 (50)
 Lowe, R. T. (1855 ["1854"). Catalogus molluscorum pneumonatorum insularum Maderensium: or a list of all the land and freshwater shells, recent and fossil, of the Madeiran islands: arranged in groups according to their natural affinities; with diagnoses of the groups, and of the new or hitherto imperfectly defined species. Proceedings of the Zoological Society of London. 22: 161-208]

 
Gastropod genera
Taxa named by Richard Thomas Lowe
Taxonomy articles created by Polbot